Mount Barker was an electoral district of the House of Assembly in the Australian state of South Australia from 1857 to 1902.

Mount Barker was also the name of one of the sixteen districts in the unicameral South Australian Legislative Council, which existed from July 1851 to February 1857; John Baker was the elected representative.

The town of Mount Barker is currently represented by the safe Liberal seat of Kavel.

Members

References

Electoral districts of South Australia
1857 establishments in Australia
1902 disestablishments in Australia